The truncated triakis octahedron, or more precisely an order-8 truncated triakis octahedron, is a convex polyhedron with 30 faces: 8 sets of 3 pentagons arranged in an octahedral arrangement, with 6 octagons in the gaps.

Triakis octahedron
It is constructed from taking a triakis octahedron by truncating the order-8 vertices. This creates 6 regular octagon faces, and leaves 24 mirror-symmetric pentagons.

Octakis truncated cube
The dual of the order-8 truncated triakis octahedron is called a octakis truncated cube. It can be seen as a truncated cube with octagonal pyramids augmented to the faces.

See also
 Truncated triakis tetrahedron
 Truncated tetrakis cube
 Truncated triakis icosahedron

External links 
 George Hart's Polyhedron generator - "t8kO" (Conway polyhedron notation)

Polyhedra
Truncated tilings